Matthew James Emrys Green (born 19 April 1993) is an English former first-class cricketer.

Green was born at Wakefield in April 1993. Moving south to Kent as a child, he was educated at The Skinners' School, before going up to St Cuthbert's Society, Durham. While studying at Durham, he made three appearances in first-class cricket for Durham MCCU, playing against Middlsex and Durham in 2012 and Durham in 2013. Playing as a right-arm slow pace bowler, he took 4 wickets in his three matches at an average of 57.50, with best figures of 2 for 60.

References

External links

1993 births
Living people
People from Wakefield
People educated at The Skinners' School
Alumni of St Cuthbert's Society, Durham
English cricketers
Durham MCCU cricketers